Central State Teachers College may refer to:

 the former name of Central Michigan University
 the former name of the University of Central Oklahoma (1919–1938)
 the former name of Wisconsin State University–Stevens Point